In probability theory, the stable count distribution is the conjugate prior of a one-sided stable distribution. This distribution was discovered by Stephen Lihn (Chinese: 藺鴻圖) in his 2017 study of daily distributions of the S&P 500 and the VIX. The stable distribution family is also sometimes referred to as the Lévy alpha-stable distribution, after Paul Lévy, the first mathematician to have studied it.

Of the three parameters defining the distribution, the stability parameter  is most important. Stable count distributions have . All the moments are finite for the distribution.

Definition 
Its standard distribution is defined as

 

where   and 

Its location-scale family is defined as

 

In the above expression,  is a  one-sided stable distribution, which is defined as following.

 

where .

Consider the Lévy sum  where , then  has the density  where . Set , we arrive at  without the normalization constant.

The reason why this distribution is called "stable count" can be understood by the relation . Note that  is the "count" of the Lévy sum. Given a fixed , this distribution gives the probability of taking  steps to travel one unit of distance.

Integral form

Based on the double-sine integral above, it leads to the integral form of the standard CDF:

where  is the sine integral function.

The Wright representation 
In "Series representation", it is shown that the stable count distribution is a special case of the Wright function (See Section 4 of ):

This leads to the Hankel integral: (based on (1.4.3) of )

where Ha represents a Hankel contour.

Alternative derivation – lambda decomposition 
Another approach to derive the stable count distribution is to use the Laplace transform of the one-sided stable distribution, (Section 2.4 of )

 where  .

Let , and one can decompose the integral on the left hand side as a product distribution of a standard Laplace distribution and a standard stable count distribution,

where  .

This is called the "lambda decomposition" (See Section 4 of ) since the LHS was named as "symmetric lambda distribution" in Lihn's former works. However, it has several more popular names such as "exponential power distribution", or the "generalized error/normal distribution", often referred to when . It is also the Weibull survival function in Reliability engineering.

Lambda decomposition is the foundation of Lihn's framework of asset returns under the stable law. The LHS is the distribution of asset returns. On the RHS, the Laplace distribution represents the lepkurtotic noise, and the stable count distribution represents the volatility.

Stable Vol Distribution 
A variant of the stable count distribution is called the stable vol distribution . It can be derived from lambda decomposition by a change of variable (See Section 6 of ).

where

Connection to Gamma and Poisson Distributions 

The shape parameter of the Gamma and Poisson Distributions is connected to the inverse of Lévy's stability parameter . 

By replacing  with the decomposition and carrying out one integral, we have:

This is in the form of a product distribution. The term  in the RHS is associated with a Weibull distribution of shape . Hence, this formula connects the stable count distribution to the probability density function of a Gamma distribution (here) and the probability mass function of a Poisson distribution (here). And the shape parameter  can be regarded as inverse of Lévy's stability parameter .

Connection to Chi and Chi-Squared Distributions 

Hence, the original idea of viewing  as an integer index in the lambda decomposition is justified here.

For the chi-squared distribution, it is straightforward since the chi-squared distribution is a special case of the gamma distribution, in that .

For the chi distribution, we begin with its CDF , where  .

 

This formula connects  with  through the  term.

Connection to Generalized Gamma Distributions 

The generalized gamma distribution is a probability distribution with two shape parameters, and is the super set of the gamma distribution, the Weibull distribution, the exponential distribution, and the half-normal distribution.

where  denotes the PDF of a generalized gamma distribution. 
This formula connects  with  through the  term. The  term is an exponent representing the second degree of freedom in the shape-parameter space.

Asymptotic properties 
For stable distribution family, it is essential to understand its asymptotic behaviors. From, for small ,

This confirms .

For large ,

This shows that the tail of  decays exponentially at infinity. The larger  is, the stronger the decay.

Moments 
All positive moments are finite. This in a way solves the thorny issue of diverging moments in the stable distribution. (See Section 2.4 of )

The analytic solution of moments is obtained through the Wright function:

where (See (1.4.28) of )

The variance is

Moment generating function 
The MGF can be expressed by a Fox-Wright function or Fox H-function:

Known analytical case – quartic stable count 
When ,  is the Lévy distribution which is an inverse gamma distribution. Thus  is a shifted gamma distribution of shape 3/2 and scale ,

 

where , .

This called "quartic stable count distribution". The word "quartic" comes from Lihn's former work on the lambda distribution where . At this setting, many facets of stable count distribution have elegant analytical solutions.

The CDF is  where  is the lower incomplete gamma function. (See Section 3 of )

Special case when α → 1 
As  becomes larger, the peak of the distribution becomes sharper. The distribution behaves like a Dirac delta function,

Series representation

Based on the series representation of the one-sided stable distribution, we have:

.

This series representation has two interpretations:

 First, a similar form of this series was first given in Pollard (1948), and in "Relation to Mittag-Leffler function", it is stated that  where  is the Laplace transform of the Mittag-Leffler function  .
 Secondly, this series is a special case of the Wright function : (See Section 1.4 of )

The Wright representation leads to analytical solutions for many statistical properties of the stable count distribution and establish another connection to fractional calculus.

Applications 

Stable count distribution can represent the daily distribution of VIX quite well. Thus the stable count distribution is the first-order marginal distribution of a volatility process. In this context,  is called the "floor volatility". In practice, VIX rarely drops below 10. This phenomenon justifies the concept of "floor volatility". A sample of the fit is shown below: 

Assume  is the volatility process, we have

where  is the so-called "vol of vol". The "vol of vol" for VIX is called VVIX, which has a typical value of about 85.

This SDE is analytically tractable and satisfies the Feller condition, thus  would never go below . But there is a subtle issue between theory and practice. There has been about 0.6% probability that VIX did go below . This is called "spillover".

Extremely low VIX reading indicates a very complacent market. Thus the spillover condition, carries a certain significance - When it occurs, it usually indicates the calm before the storm in the business cycle.

Generation of Random Variables 

As the CIR model above shows, it takes another input parameter  to simulate sequences of stable count random variables. The mean-reverting stochastic process takes the form of

 

which should produce  that distributes like . And  is a user-specified preference for how fast  should change. 

 

It can also be written as a ratio of two Wright functions, 

 

When , this process is reduced to the CIR model where
. 
This is the only special case where  is a straight line.

Fractional calculus

Relation to Mittag-Leffler function 
From Section 4 of, the inverse Laplace transform  of the Mittag-Leffler function  is 

On the other hand, the following relation was given by Pollard (1948),

This leads to the well-known quartic stable count result:

Relation to time-fractional Fokker-Planck equation 

The time-fractional FPE introduces the additional fractional derivative  such that , where  is the fractional diffusion coefficient.

from which the fractional density  can be calculated from an ordinary solution  via

Relation to the Weibull distribution 

For a Weibull distribution , its  parameter is equivalent to Lévy's stability parameter  in this context. A similar expression of product distribution can be derived, such that the kernel is either a Laplace distribution  or a Rayleigh distribution :

See also 

 Lévy flight
 Lévy process
 Fractional calculus
 Anomalous diffusion
 Incomplete gamma function and Gamma distribution
 Poisson distribution

References

External links 

 R Package 'stabledist' by Diethelm Wuertz, Martin Maechler and Rmetrics core team members.  Computes stable density, probability, quantiles, and random numbers.  Updated Sept. 12, 2016.

Continuous distributions
Probability distributions with non-finite variance
Power laws
 
Stability (probability)